The 2020 USC Trojans football team represented the University of Southern California in the 2020 NCAA Division I FBS football season. They played their home games at the Los Angeles Memorial Coliseum and competed as members of the South Division of the Pac-12 Conference. They were led by fifth-year head coach Clay Helton.

On August 11, the Pac-12 Conference initially canceled all fall sports competitions due to the COVID-19 pandemic. On September 24, the conference announced that a six-game conference-only season would begin on November 6, with the conference's championship game to be played on December 18. Teams not selected for the championship game would be seeded to play a seventh game.

USC compiled a 5–0 regular season record, and qualified for the Pac-12 Championship Game, which they lost to Oregon. The following day, USC announced that it would not play in any bowl game, ending the season with an overall 5–1 record.

Previous season
The Trojans finished 8–5 in 2019 and 7–2 in Conference play, placing 2nd place in the South Division behind the South Division Champions Utah.

Offseason

Transfers

The Trojans lost nine players to transfer.

The Trojans added 5 players via transfer.

Returning Starters

USC returns 37 starters in 2020 including 15 on offense, 19 on defense, and 3 on special teams.

Key departures include Michael Pittman Jr. (WR – 13 games), Austin Jackson (OT – 13 games), Drew Richmond (OT – 12 games), Christian Rector (DE – 10 games), John Houston Jr. (ILB – 13 games)

Other departures include Jack Sears (QB – 1 game in 2018), Dominic Davis (WR – 9 games), and Jacob Daniel (OG – 6 games).

Offense (15)

Defense (19)

Special teams (3)

Recruiting class

2020 NFL draft

NFL Combine

The official list of participants for the 2020 NFL Combine included USC football players Michael Pittman (WR) and Austin Jackson (OT).

Team players drafted into the NFL

Preseason

Pac-12 media days

Pac-12 media polls
In the 2020 Pac-12 preseason media poll.

Preseason All-Pac-12 teams

Personnel

Coaching staff

Roster

Depth chart

 Official Depth Chart as of 11/6/2020

True Freshman
Double Position : *

Scholarship distribution chart 

 /  / * Former Walk-on

– 85 scholarships permitted, 82 currently allotted to players

– 81 recruited players on scholarship (on former walk-ons)

– Transfer portal out : Palaie Gaoteote IV (ILB, -), Abdul-Malik McClain (OLB, Jackson State), Chase McGrath (K, -)

– COVID-19 Opt out to NFL : Jay Tufele (DL)

Scholarship Distribution 2020

Schedule

Regular season
USC had games scheduled against Alabama, New Mexico, and Notre Dame, but canceled these games on July 10 because the Pac-12 Conference decided to play a conference-only schedule because of the COVID-19 pandemic.

Game summaries

Arizona State

Arizona

Utah

Washington State

UCLA

{{Americanfootballbox
|bg=#fff
|bg2=#eee
|titlestyle=; ;text-align:center;
|state=collapsed

|title=USC Trojans at UCLA Bruins
|date=December 12, 2020
|time= 4:30 p.m. PST

|road=Trojans
|R1=0|R2=10|R3=13|R4=20
|home=Bruins
|H1=7|H2=14|H3=14|H4=3

|stadium=Rose Bowl, Pasadena, California
|attendance=0
|weather=Temperature:  • Wind: NE at  • Weather: Sunny Humidity at 59%
|referee=
|TV= ABC
|TVAnnouncers= Dave Pasch, Greg McElroy, Allison Williams
|reference=
|scoring=
1st Quarter
 UCLA (3:05) – #1 Dorian Thompson-Robinson to #36 Ethan Fernea for a 33 yard pass TD (#2 Nicholas Barr-Mira kick) – UCLA 7–0 Drive 10 Plays, 85 yards, 4:13
2nd Quarter
 UCLA (8:41) – #1 Dorian Thompson-Robinson to #10 Demetric Felton for a 21 yard pass TD (#2 Nicholas Barr-Mira kick) – UCLA 14–0 Drive 6 Plays, 61 yards, 2:12
 USC (7:34) – #9 Kedon Slovis to #15 Drake London for a 65 yard pass TD (#48 Parker Lewis kick) UCLA 14–7 Drive 3 Plays, 75 yards, 1:07
 USC (3:26)- #48 Parker Lewis kicks a 42 yard field goal – UCLA 14–10 Drive 7 Plays, 3 yards, 3:29
 UCLA (0:20) – #1 Dorian Thompson-Robinson to #10 Demetric Felton for a 12 yard pass TD (#2 Nicholas Barr-Mira kick) – UCLA 21–10 Drive 11 Plays, 75 yards, 3:063rd Quarter
 UCLA (12:28) – #28 Brittain Brown runs for a 15 yard TD (#2 Nicholas Barr-Mira kick) – UCLA 28–10 Drive 7 Plays, 75 yards 2:32 USC (10:25) – #9 Kedon Slovis to #21 Tyler Vaughns for a 38 yard pass TD (#48 Parker Lewis kick) – UCLA 28–17 Drive 7 Plays, 75 yards, 2:03 USC (4:00) – #9 Kedon Slovis to #8 Amon-Ra St. Brown for a 3 yard pass TD (2 point Conversation failed) – UCLA 28–23 Drive 10 Plays, 31 yards, 4:03 UCLA (1:16) – #1 Dorian Thompson-Robinson to #85 Greg Dulcich for a 69 yard pass TD (#2 Nicholas Barr-Mira kick) – UCLA 35–23 Drive 1 Play, 69 yards, 0:094th Quarter
 USC (11:40) – #29 Vavae Malepeai runs for a 10 yard TD (#48 Parker Lewis kick) – UCLA 35–30 Drive 11 Plays, 75 yards, 4:36 USC (8:09) – #9 Kedon Slovis to #15 Drake London for a 9 yard pass TD (2 Point Conversion failed) – USC 36–35 Drive 6 Plays, 30 yards 2:10 UCLA (0:52) – #2 Nicholas Barr-Mira kicks a 43 yard field goal – UCLA 38–36 Drive 7 Plays, 51 yards, 2:09 USC (0:16) – #9 Kedon Slovis to #8 Amon-Ra St. Brown for a 8 yard pass TD (#48 Parker Lewis kick) – USC 43–38 Drive 2 Plays, 43 yards, 0:27|stats=
Passing
 USC – #9 Kedon Slovis 30/47 344 yds 5 touchdown 2 interception
 UCLA – #1 Dorian Thompson-Robinson 30/36 364 yds 4 touchdown 2 interception
Rushing
 USC – #29 Vavae Malepeai 19 Att, 110 yds, 1 touchdown
 UCLA – #10 Demetric Felton 21 Att, 90 yds, 0 touchdown
Receiving
 USC – #21 Tyler Vaughns 8 Rec, 128 yds, 1 touchdown
 UCLA – #85 Greg Dulcich 8 Rec, 167 yds, 1 touchdown
}}

Oregon

Rankings

StatisticsPac-12 opponents'''

Offense

Defense

Key: POS: Position, SOLO: Solo Tackles, AST: Assisted Tackles, TOT: Total Tackles, TFL: Tackles-for-loss, SACK: Quarterback Sacks, INT: Interceptions, BU: Passes Broken Up, PD: Passes Defended, QBH: Quarterback Hits, FR: Fumbles Recovered, FF: Forced Fumbles, BLK: Kicks or Punts Blocked, SAF: Safeties, TD : Touchdown

Special teams

Players drafted into the NFL

References

USC
USC Trojans football seasons
USC Trojans football
USC Trojans football